Paradox is an unincorporated community and a U.S. Post Office located in the Paradox Valley, Montrose County, Colorado, United States.  The Paradox Post Office has the ZIP Code 81429.

Name
The geologist, Albert Charles Peale named Paradox in 1875; he declared that the Delores River had the “desire to perform strange and unexpected things” due to the unusual course of the river. Rather than flowing parallel to the valley, the river runs horizontally across the valley, cutting through cliff walls at 90 degree angles.

George R. Eichler wrote in the book, Colorado Place Names, that Paradox was nearly inaccessible to early settlers. To enter the valley, travellers had to disembark to unload their wagons. The wagons were then disassembled, and the pieces were then lowered to the valley on ropes.

History
The Paradox area had originally been home to the Ute people. It was later settled by Euro-American ranchers in the 1870's. In 1882, a post office was established. In 1897 mining began, first copper and later uranium. Paradox is a yellowcake boomtown. Uranium ore was first discovered at the Raja mine, and a sample was shipped to Marie Curie in France, although other sources state that specimens were shipped to Freidel and Cumenge in France for analysis.

In 2010 The New Yorker magazine featured an article, The Uranium Widows, on the spouses of deceased Paradox uranium workers who died from extended exposure to uranium during their employment in the local mines and mills.

Geography
Paradox is located in Paradox Valley at  (38.368310,-108.962574).

Population
In 1991, the population of Paradox was "around two hundred."

References

Unincorporated communities in Montrose County, Colorado
Unincorporated communities in Colorado